Kristina Savitskaya ( born 10 June 1991) is a Russian track and field athlete. She competed at the 2012 Summer Olympics in the women's heptathlon event. In the 800 m event of the heptathlon, her foot crossed the lane-marking line too early, but this led to a mistaken disqualification of Lilli Schwarzkopf in the neighbouring lane. However, the disqualification was rescinded when Schwarzkopf pointed out the error. Savitskaya's final place was corrected from seventh to eighth.

She won the national title at the Russian Athletics Championships in 2012 and 2013.

International competitions

References

Living people
1991 births
Russian heptathletes
Olympic heptathletes
Olympic athletes of Russia
Athletes (track and field) at the 2012 Summer Olympics
World Athletics Championships athletes for Russia
Russian Athletics Championships winners